Zahhak Castle (or citadel) is a castle in Hashtrud, East Azerbaijan Province, Iran. It is named after Zahhak, a figure in Persian mythology. According to various experts, it was inhabited from the second millennium BC until the Timurid era. It was first excavated in the 19th century by British archeologists. Iran's Cultural Heritage Organization has been studying the structure in 6 phases.

References

External links
 Tishineh

Castles in Iran
Parthian castles
Buildings and structures in East Azerbaijan Province

National works of Iran
Parthian architecture